Counterregulatory eating is the psychological tendency for a person to eat more after having recently eaten. It is a behavior opposite to regulatory eating, which is the normal pattern of eating less if one has already eaten. It is more common among dieters, for whom a large "pre-load" (the food eaten first) is presumed to sabotage motivation for restricted eating.

It was coined the "what-the-hell" effect by dieting researcher Janet Polivy in 2010. She describes this effect as the type of thinking which says, "What the hell, my diet's already broken, so I might as well eat everything in sight." It has been observed that reducing the guilt of overeating through self-forgiveness can mitigate counterregulatory eating.

References 

Eating behaviors of humans